"Living Darfur" (also known as "Living") is the first single from Mattafix's album Rhythm and Hymns, released in 2007.  The beginning of the song sounds similar to a part of Madonna's song "Mother and Father", taken from her 2003 release American Life.
The Zulu part of the song is a sample of South African song "Umagubane" by Chicco Twala.

Music video
The music video, funded by Mick Jagger and set in a refugee camp, aims to raise awareness for Darfur and catch the attention of the United Nations.  It was released on 16 September 2007, which is "Global Day for Darfur".  The video was shot in Eastern Chad on the border of Darfur. Matt Damon makes a brief cameo in the video.

Track listings

Digital download
"Living Darfur"  (Marlon Roudette/Chico Twala)

CD single
"Living Darfur"  (Marlon Roudette/Chico Twala) 
"Living Darfur" (Desert Eagle Discs Remix)

Enhanced CD single
"Living Darfur"
"Living Darfur" (Desert Eagle Discs Remix)
"Living Darfur" (Video)

EP
"Living Darfur"
"Living Darfur" (Instrumental)
"Living Darfur" (Subway Remix)
"Living Darfur" (Desert Eagle Discs Remix)

Charts

Weekly charts

Year-end charts

References

External links
 The music video

2007 singles
2007 songs
Virgin Records singles
Songs written by Marlon Roudette
Mattafix songs